Charlotte Nicdao (born 14 August 1991) is an Australian actress and composer. She is known for her roles as Jackie Lee in the Nine Network series A gURLs wURLd (2010–2011) and Poppy Li in the Apple TV+ comedy Mythic Quest (2020–).

Career 
Nicdao attended Victorian College of Arts and studied jazz and classical music. After an audition for a role in which she did not get the part, Nicdao discovered that her true love was acting.

Nicdao's big break happened in 2008 when she was cast as Jackie in A gURLs wURLd. Nicdao auditioned when she was 17. The show filmed in Sydney, Singapore, and Hamburg, so Nicdao completed the final year of high school by distance education with the goal to return to Melbourne and make a career out of jazz singing.

In 2014, Nicdao joined the second season cast of Josh Thomas' Australian TV series Please Like Me, and played the role of Tom's girlfriend Jenny.

In 2019, Nicdao starred as Lucy in Content, a made-for-phone online video series. The first episode, about a millennial who wanted to go viral, actually went viral when the video of her crashing her car was shared by many who thought it was footage of a real accident.

In 2020, Nicdao starred as Poppy in Mythic Quest. Nicdao described the role as her dream role. About the advent of more roles for people of Asian heritage, Nicdao stated about her role in Mythic Quest, "I think there was a time with the only characters available to me were very one dimensional and now I'm getting to play this very complex woman at the center of a story and it's beautiful."

Nicdao voiced a princess character in Adventure Time.

Personal life 
Nicdao was inspired by her father, Filipino Australian actor Alfred Nicdao. As a child, she would often be called to auditions by her father's agent.

Nicdao has stated that if she could be a book, she would be If on a Winters Night a Traveler by Italo Calvino because "every chapter is a new story and a new world".

In 2012, Nicdao formed pop music group Charlotte Nicdao and the Sloth Orchestra with friends from college. In January 2013, the band successfully crowdfund their debut EP, recorded at Sing Sing studios with Australian music engineer Adam Rhodes. Plans to release the album in March 2013 were put on hold when Nicdao was cast in the NBC television series Camp, and delayed the release of the EP to 2014. Nicdao describes herself as "a passive-aggressive sunshine pop fairy". Nicdao started training as a jazz singer when she was 15, inspired by Ella Fitzgerald, John Coltrane, Miles Davis, and Keith Jarrett.

Nicdao and her husband Bayden Hine ran a plant store in Melbourne known as Plant by Packwood. The store closed in November 2019.

When asked by 1883 magazine which big movie franchise Nicdao would love to be a part of, she expressed her deep love of Star Wars, especially Yoda, whom she made a fan club for at school.

Filmography

Film

Television

Online

Music

References

External links
 

1991 births
Living people
21st-century Australian actresses
Australian child actresses
Australian expatriates in Germany
Australian expatriates in Singapore
Australian people of Filipino descent
Australian people of Asian descent
Actresses from the Northern Territory
Australian actresses of Asian descent